OneSoccer is a Canadian English language television channel and English and French language subscription over-the-top video streaming service owned by Mediapro Canada. The service broadcasts programming related to soccer including live and pre-taped games, recap shows, and more. It currently serves as the main rightsholder of the Canadian Soccer Association, including holding the rights to the Canadian Premier League, Canadian Championship, and national team matches. It also serves as rightsholder for various CONCACAF competitions, including the CONCACAF Gold Cup.

History 

On March 28, 2019, the Canadian Premier League and the Canadian Soccer Association announced the creation of Canadian Soccer Business (CSB), an organization "representing commercial assets and inventory for marquee soccer properties in Canada", including "all corporate partnerships and broadcast rights related to Canada Soccer's core assets including its national teams, along with all rights associated with the CPL". On February 21, 2019, it announced a 10-year agreement with Mediapro, under which it holds all media rights associated with Canada Soccer, including rights to the Canadian Premier League, the Canadian Championship, and rights to national team matches. In April, Mediapro announced that its rights would be housed in a new subscription service known as OneSoccer, which launched as an online-only live and on-demand subscription service through its website on April 26, 2019, with its first live match airing the next day.

In August 2019, OneSoccer acquired rights to the 2019–20 CONCACAF Nations League season. In January 2020, OneSoccer acquired exclusive Canadian rights to various CONCACAF championships through 2023, including the CONCACAF Gold Cup.

In September 2021, Mediapro Canada announced OneSoccer's first third-party launch of the service via FuboTV's streaming package in Canada. Later that month, Mediapro Canada announced that it had reached its first deal for carriage of OneSoccer as a linear television channel, with Telus TV.

Broadcasting rights

Clubs
 Canadian Premier League
 Canadian Championship
 CONCACAF League
 CONCACAF Champions League
 Spanish Primera División Feminina
 French Ligue 1 (Lille matches only)
 Eredivisie
 Chinese Super League

National teams 

CONCACAF Gold Cup
CONCACAF Nations League
Canadian men's and women's national soccer teams' home matches

Staff 
 OneSoccer's commentary and analysis team features Andi Petrillo, Kristian Jack, Gareth Wheeler, Oliver Platt, Adam Jenkins, Armen Bedakian, and Alexandre Gangué-Ruzic.

References

External links
Official site

Internet television channels
Soccer on Canadian television
Sports television networks in Canada
Subscription video streaming services
Internet properties established in 2019
2019 establishments in Canada
Canadian Premier League
Television channels and stations established in 2021